The ubiquitous presidency is a political communication theory that describes the communication and government style of U.S. presidents in the late twentieth and early twenty-first centuries. The ubiquitous presidency theory, as a paradigm shift, occurred in 1992, following the rhetorical and modern presidency theories, and is still relevant today. The ubiquitous presidency focuses primarily on accessibility, personalization, pluralism in relation with four other attributes. These four other attributes include targeting media, diversity, adaption, and co-construction.

The ubiquitous presidency is used to describe the contemporary presidency in the United States, characterized by the president's constant presence and engagement in various forms of media and communication, including social media, television, and public events. Overall, the term "ubiquitous presidency" captures the idea that modern presidents are expected to be constantly visible and engaged with the public, using a range of media platforms to communicate their message and shape their political/public images.

Definitions of focuses and attributes 
Primary focuses of the Ubiquitous Presidency includes accessibility, personalization, and pluralism in conjunction with targeting media, diversity, adaption, co-construction.  

 Accessibility - within this context consists of - politicians presenting themselves to the public in many ways. Meaning that the majority of people will have access to their campaign in some format (television, newspapers, radio, internet, social media). In the past, when media was not as big, this meant offering the public opportunities to interact with the campaign. In the 2021st century, where media is wide spread this means the public is able to communicate with the campaign directly (email, call, and letter) or indirectly (social media, tweets, etc.).
 Personalization is crucial to a successful campaign. As people are more likely to vote for another person, or politician, then the party they represent within the election. It is important to show the electorate that the politician is a person who is willing and able to be casual, lighthearted, and common. This is usually shown through the disclosure of that politicians personal life, both bad and good.
 Pluralism is used to engage certain parts of some ones identity in order to sway them in the election. In the past, during the Rhetorical presidency candidates would refer to the mass public in the United States as the "public, people, etc." However, in the Ubiquitous presidency candidates will call on some ones identity, such as their race, ethnicity, sexual orientation, and ability, in order to demonstrate that the candidate sees them more as individual, and less as numbers. 
 Targeting media occurs when a politician looks to target a certain demographic so they access their frequently used media - such as television, radio, magazines, social media, etc. - to procure their votes.
 Diverse, segmented, or disinterested populations will be sought out by candidates, and if they are able to find ways to identify with that community then they will most likely have the opportunities to create a strong enough connection in which to harness votes. 
 Adaption and identification directly occurs as a result of the candidate putting out a message to multiple different segments of the population, in order to receive numerous votes from various different sources, which would create a wide voting pool. Being able to identify which population will give the candidate the most votes and being able to adapt their message is key.
 Co-construction occurs when individuals, within the public, are able to influence the campaign content and help structure the political messages put out by the campaign to its wider audience.

History 
The ubiquitous presidency was originally proposed by political communication theorists Joshua M. Scacco and Kevin Coe in 2016, in their article entitled The Ubiquitous Presidency: Toward a New Paradigm for Studying Presidential Communication. The idea of a ubiquitous presidency was theorized when Scacco and Coe posited that the idea of a rhetorical presidency was limited, and no longer concurrent with modern presidential communication tactics. At a time when the office of the American Presidency was evolving, and new media technologies were emerging, the way presidents communicated evolved beyond the rhetorical presidency. The new prevalence of digital media has had a big impact on the shift to a ubiquitous presidency, as presidents can more easily access their audiences, and be more visible in a public setting. 

The idea of a ubiquitous presidency has its roots in the advent of radio and television technology. Scacco and Coe traces the beginnings of such a paradigm to the radio addresses of Franklin D. Roosevelt, with the ubiquitous presidency evolving alongside media. Presidential appearances would become more frequent and informal, until the time of Bill Clinton, when the ubiquitous presidency truly began.

Media 
Media is an essential part of the ubiquitous presidency. "The ubiquitous presidency is a deliberate strategy of presidents to reach the public by saturating the media environment with their messaging." Early on the era of the ubiquitous presidency, politicians would utilize platforms such as talk shows to spread their messaging. Eventually, with the advent of social media, politicians would add social media to their communications playbook. Media has allowed presidents to meet audiences where they are at, which is often in spaces that are not traditionally political. Through the growth of social media we see presidents communicate more, sending their messages directly to the public via Twitter, Instagram, Facebook, and other platforms. Using these platforms, presidents can communicate whenever and however they want.

Diversity 
The United States is a nation built upon diversity. With presidential communication easier than ever, politicians are more likely to see peoples messages that they might not have seen in the past. The ubiquitous presidency is more aware of, and potentially more invested in, diverse groups of people. This leads to an overall better connection between the president and various groups/people within American society.

Barack Obama, in his 2009 inaugural address, embodied the ubiquitous presidency by including more diverse groups of people in his references to the American people. Obama, describing the religious makeup of the American people, was the first president to publicly include atheists and Hindus in his speech. This shows a move towards pluralism and diversity in presidential communications.

Examples of the ubiquitous presidency 
Scacco and Coe write about how the ubiquitous presidency is a “new paradigm” that has evolved with the political media in the United States. Contemporary presidencies, starting from 1992 until today, demonstrate how each president communicated throughout their term(s), as well as showing the evolution of the ubiquitous presidency in action.

Bill Clinton 

 Bill Clinton won the 1992 presidential election, beating the incumbent, George H.W. Bush. Clinton’s communication strategies for his campaign revolved around doing research to identify the key issues for voters, responding quickly to negative comments made by his opponent, and presenting him as a face of change who was running against someone with very traditional values. Bill Clinton is also credited as beginning the era of the ubiquitous presidency with his appearance on the Arsenio Hall Show in 1992.
 During Clinton's election campaign he appeared on the Arsenio Hall Show playing the saxophone. Through his exposure on the show, with a primary black and younger audience, he took part in targeted media towards a diverse audience. With this appearance, Clinton was also able to personalize his campaign by presenting himself as an individual with personality.

George W. Bush 

George W. Bush was the president directly after Bill Clinton, and his presidency marked continuation in the development of the ubiquitous presidency. Bush increased the personalization of the presidential office, allowing the public further access into his private and family life. This personalization is achieved through the use of media; an example of this is his appearance on The Ellen Degeneres Show. Bush's daughter, Jenna Bush, gives him a call on the show, demonstrating the family dynamics of the Bush family, something that would have been much more private before the ubiquitous presidency.
In accordance with a ubiquitous presidency, media becomes more ubiquitous as well. During Bush's tenure as president, his daughters were cited for underage drinking, and this was widely reported in the media. In the past, this information would have been much easier for a politician to suppress.
During Bush's campaigning, he created a distinctive brand in order to win him the election: this consisted of both personalization and targeting media. His brand aligned itself with the American spirit, hard-working everyday people, and religious families. He was able to personalize his persona by identifying himself with his career in the military, and his upbringing in a middle-class Christian family. This connected Bush with the public while also targeting them through the media, if they were a part of any represented group.

Barack Obama 

 Barack Obama began his run for presidency at a time when media was changing rapidly. He utilized social media, especially Twitter, to address issues related to accessibility, personalization, and pluralism.Obama also made several public appearances that were unusual for a president, such as: attending a televised college basketball match in 2010, appearing on The Tonight Show in 2011, NBC's Late Night in 2012, in which he "slow jammed" the news with the show's host Jimmy Fallon, and the Grammy Awards in 2015, using this appearance to promote his campaign to reduce sexual assault on college campuses. These appearances are prime examples of the ubiquitous presidency, in that Obama is not only addressing audiences through many different popular platforms, but portraying himself as accessible, funny, and even relatable. Social media use by Barack Obama was instrumental in his presidential campaign.
 Obama utilized Facebook extremely well during his 2012 campaign. They set up a way for social media to go hand in hand with their campaign efforts. The re-election team Obama for America, will be inviting its supporters to log on to the campaign website via Facebook, thus allowing the campaign to access their personal data and add it to the central data store – the largest, most detailed and potentially most powerful in the history of political campaigns. Obama used the data from Facebook to know exactly who was voting for him, and what he needed to do to make his messages cater to them.

Donald Trump 

 Before ever getting into politics, Donald Trump had already been a mainstream celebrity for decades. He was the executive producer and host of the first season of the NBC show The Apprentice, where contestants competed to be hired in the position of his apprentice.
 Donald Trump used very different communication strategies in his campaign compared to previous presidents, and it worked in his favor. Trump was already a mainstream celebrity, which hasn't been something we've seen a lot in American politics. His constant use of Twitter and other social media platforms got his messages out to a massive audience. The ideas for his presidency were all very grandiose, and he wrote his messages in a more informal way than most presidents. Both of those factors were part of a larger strategy to be a fresh face in politics for people across the country.
 During his campaign in 2016, Trump seemed to have taken a page out of Obama's book as he chose to primarily utilize facebook. Some 80 percent of the digital ad budget was spent on Facebook, Brad Parscale has said, with the campaign creating thousands of iterations of slightly tweaked ads meant to test which sales pitch was most effective. The slightly tweaked ads are a way of maximizing ubiquity by seeing which ad resonates the best with audiences.

Trump's Twitter 

 Trump's use of Twitter was so frequent that he was nicknamed the "Commander in Tweet" by NPR White House correspondent Tamara Keith. 
 Throughout his presidency, he utilized social media in an unprecedented way. Instead of using social media solely as a way to get news out to the public, he used it just as a regular person would. Because of this, Trump's supporters felt more connected to the president throughout his presidency.

Joe Biden 

 Before being elected president he had prevously made appearances across different forms of media. One being an appearance on the NBC sitcom Parks and Recreation in 2012 during his time as Vice President of the Obama administration.

 In order to beat incumbent Donald Trump, Joe Biden had to utilize social media in a way he hadn't done before. Trump was very present on social media, and constantly shared his views on issues across the country. Additionally, because of covid, there were less electoral meetings before the election than there usually would be. This made having a strong social media presence especially important for the candidates in 2020.

Relation to the rhetorical presidency 
The ubiquitous presidency as a theory is the evolution of a previously proposed theory, the theory of the rhetorical presidency. The idea of a rhetorical presidency was based on assumptions that were correct when they were proposed, but eventually became obsolete in favor of the ubiquitous presidency. The rhetorical presidency was based on the idea of presidential mass communication to a united audience, i.e the people of the United States of America. It was assumed that this audience was of a "common purpose". However, media has changed, as well as how media is presented to audiences.

References

Sources

Further reading
 
 
 

Communication theory
Presidency of the United States
Political science in the United States